{{Infobox settlement
| name                   = 
| image_skyline          = 
| image_caption          = 
| image_flag             = Flag of Irosin, Sorsogon.png
| flag_size              = 120x80px
| image_seal             = 
| seal_size              = 100x80px
| image_map              = 
| map_caption            = 
| image_map1             = 
| pushpin_map            = Philippines
| pushpin_label_position = right
| pushpin_map_caption    = Location within the 
| coordinates            = 
| settlement_type        = 
| subdivision_type       = Country
| subdivision_name       = Philippines
| subdivision_type1      = Region
| subdivision_name1      = 
| subdivision_type2      = Province
| subdivision_name2      = 
| official_name          = 
| etymology              =  
| named_for              =  
| native_name            =
| other_name             =
| nickname               =
| motto                  =
| anthem                 =
| subdivision_type3      = District
| subdivision_name3      = 
| established_title      = Founded
| established_date       = 
| parts_type             = Barangays
| parts_style            = para
| p1                     =   (see Barangays)
| leader_title           =  
| leader_name            = Alfredo J. Cielo Jr.
| leader_title1          = Vice Mayor
| leader_name1           = Christian D. Lim
| leader_title2          = Representative 
| leader_name2           = Vacant
| leader_title3          = Municipal Council
| leader_name3           = 
| leader_title4          = Electorate 
| leader_name4           =  voters
| government_type        = 
| government_footnotes   = 
| elevation_m            = 
| elevation_max_m        = 791
| elevation_min_m        = 20
| elevation_max_rank     =
| elevation_min_rank     =
| elevation_footnotes    = 
| elevation_max_footnotes= 
| elevation_min_footnotes= 
| area_rank              =
| area_footnotes         = 
| area_total_km2         = 
| population_footnotes   = 
| population_total       = 
| population_as_of       = 
| population_density_km2 = auto
| population_blank1_title= Households
| population_blank1      =  
| population_demonym     =
| population_rank        =
| population_note        =
| timezone               = PST
| utc_offset             = +8
| postal_code_type       = ZIP code
| postal_code            = 
| postal2_code_type      = 
| postal2_code           = 
| area_code_type         = 
| area_code              = 
| website                = 
| demographics_type1     = Economy
| demographics1_title1   = 
| demographics1_info1    = 
| demographics1_title2   = Poverty incidence
| demographics1_info2    = %
| demographics1_title3   = Revenue
| demographics1_info3    =  
| demographics1_title4   = Revenue rank
| demographics1_info4    = 
| demographics1_title5   = Assets
| demographics1_info5    =  
| demographics1_title6   = Assets rank
| demographics1_info6    = 
| demographics1_title7   = IRA
| demographics1_info7    = 
| demographics1_title8   = IRA rank
| demographics1_info8    = 
| demographics1_title9   = Expenditure
| demographics1_info9    =  
| demographics1_title10  = Liabilities
| demographics1_info10   =  
| demographics_type2     = Service provider 
| demographics2_title1   = Electricity
| demographics2_info1    =  
| demographics2_title2   = Water
| demographics2_info2    = 
| demographics2_title3   = Telecommunications
| demographics2_info3    = 
| demographics2_title4   = Cable TV and others
| demographics2_info4    =
| blank_name_sec1        = 
| blank_info_sec1        = 
| blank1_name_sec1       = Native languages
| blank1_info_sec1       = 
| blank2_name_sec1       = Crime index
| blank2_info_sec1       = 
| blank3_name_sec1       = 
| blank3_info_sec1       = 
| blank4_name_sec1       = 
| blank4_info_sec1       = 
| blank5_name_sec1       = 
| blank5_info_sec1       = 
| blank6_name_sec1       = 
| blank6_info_sec1       = 
| blank7_name_sec1       = 
| blank7_info_sec1       = 
| blank1_name_sec2       = Major religions
| blank1_info_sec2       = 
| blank2_name_sec2       = Feast date
| blank2_info_sec2       = 
| blank3_name_sec2       = Catholic diocese
| blank3_info_sec2       =
| blank4_name_sec2       = Patron saint 
| blank4_info_sec2       = 
| blank5_name_sec2       = 
| blank5_info_sec2       = 
| blank6_name_sec2       = 
| blank6_info_sec2       = 
| blank7_name_sec2       = 
| blank7_info_sec2       =
| short_description      =
| footnotes              =
}}

Irosin, officially the Municipality of Irosin (Waray Sorsogon: Bungto san Irosin'';), is a 2nd class municipality in the province of Sorsogon, Philippines. According to the 2020 census, it has a population of 59,267 people.

History

Earlier than 1847, Irosin was a far inland valley unspoiled by human settlers and covered by vast forest expanse teeming with wild animals. Irosin was among the last places in the Philippines to be populated. Most of the natives during the early 1800s lived along the coastal areas where it was more accessible to commercial, travel and communication activities at the time.

The place had been an undisturbed sanctuary for wildlife until settlers from Bulusan came in search of wild quarry and rattan. These pioneers, using the slash-and-burn method, cleared a settlement beside a river which gave birth to a clearing called Hin-ay, an Albayanon word which denotes the arrangement of the abaca yarn or tupos into a zigzagging pattern ( hinan-ay) in preparation for its actual weaving. Accordingly, the hin-ay or the pattern was the image drawn to connote the waving rivers crisscrossing from the mountains down the valley. In yet another account, the word hin-ay was purported to have been derived from the term an-hay which means gradually ascending. The original settlement which is now called San Agustin is located east of the town proper at a higher elevation, thus the gradual ascent from the lower villages to the then barrio center of San Agustin.

It was in 1847 when Hin-ay was declared a barrio of Bulusan. The Gobernadorcillo of Bulusan visited Hin-ay and appointed Apolonio Capido as the first barrio lieutenant. Deeply influenced by Catholicism brought by the Spanish friars, the natives of Hin-ay constructed a makeshift chapel and dedicated it to their patron Saint Michael Archangel. As years passed, the original clearing had grown into a bustling community and eventually, the settlers requested the church authorities to bestow upon San Miguel a status independent and separate from that of Bulusan. The petition was granted and Holy Masses on Sundays and holidays of obligation were held regularly. In 1876, the Parish of San Miguel was officially recognized with Father Mariano Miranda as its parish priest and consequently, Hin-ay became known as San Miguel. On December 12, 1879, through a Royal Decree executed by the Governor General Domingo Moriones y Murillo, San Miguel was made a duly constituted pueblo or town.

During those years Pedro Fruto (1881-1882), Domingo Gamba (1883-1884) and Juan Gallarda (1885-1886) were the public officials who were addressed as Capitanes del Pueblo. From the year 1880, the town of San Miguel flourished as an independent political unit under the Province of Albay when Sorsogon, until October 10, 1894, was not yet separated from its mother province. The first Guardia Civil came to Irosin in 1883. Its members were Filipinos headed by a Spanish Captain. With the spread of the underground movement called by the Spaniards hombres rebeldes in 1894, more Spanish forces called casadores were dispatched to Irosin. They imposed curfew hours in a bid to curtail the local uprisings.

It was during the incumbency of Father Esteban Rivera in 1887 when the name San Miguel was again changed to Irosin. The word was derived from the local term iros which means to cut-off a part. The word was traced to have come from an old tailor's term synonymous with tabas as in ”irosi an hiniro” or cut a part of the cloth. Iros was the image most probably drawn to connote the gush or flow of floodwaters eroding riverbanks and cutting through lands to eventually form another river or river route.

Irosin was indeed frequently eroded due to inundations of the rivers. On the 24th of December 1933, massive flooding occurred sending many inhabitants to death. A concrete river control dike in 1937 under Mayor Felipe Santiago and Congressman Norberto Roque was constructed to keep the violent surge of the river from eroding the town's mainland.

Contemporary period
On April 10, 1989, Irosin was successfully defended by military and police forces, the latter led by Lieutenant Antonio Dy who headed the town's police station, against approximately 200 communist rebels of the New People's Army, which had 20 casualties; three female civilians were killed in the crossfire. Dy later received the "Medalya ng Kagitingan" Award in August for leading his 13 policemen to defend Irosin's municipal hall.

Geography

Irosin is the only landlocked municipality in the province.

Barangays
Irosin is politically subdivided into 28 barangays.

Climate

Demographics

Economy

Tourism

Irosin has many potential tourist spots varying from natural parks, hot and cold springs, viewing areas and historical landmark.  The famous tourism attractions in the municipality are the Mateo Hot and Cold Spring Resort, St. Michael Archangel Roman Catholic Hilltop Church and protected areas. The Bolos Crystal Spring and the Valley View Park where eateries, kiosks and parking spaces were set up had become a rest area for truckers and travelers plying the Maharlika Highway. Another potential tourist attraction is the Mapaso mineral hot spring famous for its purported healing qualities. Irosin is an ideal jump-off site for mountaineering and ecological trek that is becoming popular among tourists both foreign and local. The municipality is an entry and exit area to BVNP one of the remaining tropical forests and is a protected area in the Bicol Region. Mount Jormajam and Mount Mara-ot Banwa are the other alternative places for mountaineering and ecological trekking.

There are also a number of tourist accommodations and facilities in Irosin. The Mateo Hot and Cold Springs Resort have conference halls, dormitories, cottages, eatery and swimming pools ideal for rest and recreation, conference and seminars. There is also the Guest World Resort and Nature Spring Resort with pools and accommodations. There are other lodging houses such as Villa Lim Condominium and Saint Michael Lodging House. Restaurants, snack bars and eateries are found along the CBD and inside the Irosin Public Market.

The most common cultural activities in the municipality are the annual santacruzan, barangay fiestas and town fiesta where Paray Festival is showcased. The Paray Festival in September culminates with the street play Viva San Miguel, celebrated in honor of Saint Michael Archangel, the patron saint of Irosin.

The local tourism industry has a great potential since ecological tourism is the trend worldwide and the national government intends to develop Bicol as a major hub for tourists. Given the variety of natural tourist spots in the municipality and its strategic location, Irosin can be a convergence area of foreign and domestic tourists and visitors.

Education 

Primary education

Among the known primary schools in the town are Irosin Central School and Holy Spirit Academy of Irosin. Besides the two schools, every barangay has an Elementary school run by the government.

Secondary education
Irosin has many secondary educational institutions. The largest public high school is Gallanosa National High School. There is also a Secondary School in some bigger barangays of Irosin: Gabao National High School and the Irosin North National High School. The Holy Spirit Academy of Irosin is also the only private secondary school.

Tertiary education
Veritas College of Irosin

References

External links

 
 Irosin Profile at PhilAtlas.com
 [ Philippine Standard Geographic Code]
 Philippine Census Information
 Local Governance Performance Management System 
 Veritas College of Irosin

Municipalities of Sorsogon
Spa towns in the Philippines